Malvika Iyer (born 18 February 1989) is an Indian national, a bilateral amputee from an accidental bomb blast, a social worker, and a National Awardee. She is an international motivational speaker and a disability rights activist, advocating for building an inclusive society. She is also a model for accessible fashion. Iyer obtained her Doctorate in Social Work from Madras School of Social Work in 2017. Her doctoral thesis is on the stigmatization of people with disabilities.

Early life and injury
Iyer was born on 18 February 1989 in Kumbakonam, Tamil Nadu to B. Krishnan and Hema Krishnan. She grew up in Bikaner, Rajasthan, where her father worked as an engineer at the Water Works Department. On 26 May 2002, at the age of 13, Iyer lost both her hands when she accidentally picked up a diffused grenade that exploded in her hands at her home in Bikaner and sustained severe injuries to her legs including multiple fractures, nerve paralysis and hypoesthesia. After 18 months of hospitalization (involving multiple surgeries) in Chennai, Iyer began to walk with the aid of crutches and was fitted with prosthetic hands.

Education 
Following her hospitalization, Iyer appeared as a private candidate in the Secondary School Leaving Certificate examination in Chennai. Writing the exam with the help of a scribe, she secured a state rank among the private candidates. This gained public attention. Iyer was invited to the Rashtrapati Bhavan by the then President of India, Dr. APJ Abdul Kalam.

Iyer moved to New Delhi, where she studied Economics (Honors) at St. Stephen's College, Delhi, followed by a Master's in Social Work at the Delhi School of Social Work. She did her M.Phil in Social Work at the Madras School of Social Work, where she secured first class with distinction and won the ‘Rolling Cup’ for the Best M.Phil. Thesis in 2012.

Speaking career and activism  
Iyer was invited to speak at the TEDxYouth@Chennai in 2013. She has described this experience as the start of her career as a motivational speaker. Iyer followed this up with speeches at United Nations in New York City, IIM Kozhikode, Norway, Indonesia South Africa and Singapore where she highlighted the importance of inclusion. Through her motivational talks and sensitization workshops in schools, colleges, private establishments, Non-governmental Organizations and youth forums, Iyer has tried to raise awareness about the need for universal design, accessible public spaces and participation of disabled youth in promoting inclusive elections. She has also worked towards creating awareness on a positive body image. She hosted the India Inclusion Summit in 2013. An advocate for accessible fashion, Iyer walked the ramp as a showstopper for NIFT and Ability Foundation in Chennai where she emphasized the need for designing clothes with functionality and style for people with disability. In 2014, she was selected as a Global Shaper to the Chennai Hub of the Global Shapers Community, an initiative of the World Economic Forum. She joined the United Nations Inter-Agency Network on Youth Development's Working Group on Youth and Gender Equality and in March 2017 she was invited to deliver a speech at the United Nations in New York. In October 2017, she was invited to Co-Chair the World Economic Forum's India Economic Summit held at Hotel Taj Palace, New Delhi.

Recognition 

Iyer received the Nari Shakti Puraskar, the Highest Civilian Honor for Women for outstanding contribution to women's empowerment from the Honorable President of India Ram Nath Kovind on 8 March 2018 on the occasion of International Women's Day. On 8 March 2020, she was selected by the Honorable Prime Minister of India Narendra Modi to take over his social media accounts. She is the recipient of the first Women in the World Emerging Leaders Award in New York in 2016. She was recognized as one of the 100 Change Agents and Newsmakers of the Decade by Deccan Chronicle in 2015.

References

External links 
Website

Living people
Indian motivational speakers
Indian disability rights activists
Women motivational speakers
People from Thanjavur district
Activists from Tamil Nadu
Social workers
Educators from Tamil Nadu
21st-century Indian educators
People from Bikaner
21st-century Indian women
21st-century Indian people
Women educators from Tamil Nadu
Social workers from Tamil Nadu
21st-century women educators
1989 births